Samuel Groth and Chris Guccione were the defending champions but did not participate this year.

Denys Molchanov and Andrey Rublev won the title over qualifiers Hans Hach Verdugo and Luis Patiño, 6–4, 7–6(7–5).

Seeds

Draw

References
 Main Draw

RBC Tennis Championships of Dallas - Doubles